The Hurricane Jungle is the second studio album from Shetland based band Bongshang.

Track listing
 "D/Drone" - 4:34
 "All That Hate" - 3:21
 "Probleme" - 2:48
 "Tackhead" - 4:18
 "Dubweiser" - 7:08
 "Tangled Flies" - 6:02
 "Abandon Motion" - 5:30
 "The Honeyshroud" - 6:27
 "Hurricane Jungle" - 7:18

Personnel
 JJ Jamieson - banjo, vocals, keyboards, samples
 Bryan Peterson - bass guitar, double bass, harmonica, keyboards
 Neil Preshaw - guitar, vocals, keyboards, samples, percussion
 Peter Gear - fiddle
 Christopher 'Kipper' Anderson - drums, percussion, drum programming

Guest personnel
Joanna Redmond - Vocals

Production notes
The Hurricane Jungle was recorded in "Late Night Radio Music Studios" in Scalloway (Neil Preshaw's studio), "Super Session 8 Studios" in Lerwick (JJ Jamieson's studio) and "The Love Garage" in Lerwick (Bryan Peterson's studio). The album was mixed in The Love Garage in late 1996.

References

External links
 http://www.bongshang.com/hurricane.html

1996 albums
Bongshang albums
Shetland music